A prison, also known as a jail, gaol (dated, British English, Australian, South African and historically in Canada), penitentiary (North American English), detention center (or detention centre outside the US), correction center, correctional facility, lock-up, hoosegow or remand center, is a facility in which inmates (or prisoners) are confined against their will and usually denied a variety of freedoms under the authority of the state as punishment for various crimes. Prisons are most commonly used within a criminal justice system: people charged with crimes may be imprisoned until their trial; those pleading or being found guilty of crimes at trial may be sentenced to a specified period of imprisonment. In simplest terms, a prison can also be described as a building in which people are legally held as a punishment for a crime they have committed.

Prisons can also be used as a tool of political repression by authoritarian regimes. Their perceived opponents may be imprisoned for political crimes, often without trial or other legal due process; this use is illegal under most forms of international law governing fair administration of justice. In times of war, prisoners of war or detainees may be detained in military prisons or prisoner of war camps, and large groups of civilians might be imprisoned in internment camps.

In American English, the terms prison and jail have separate definitions, though this is not always strictly adhered to in casual speech. A prison or penitentiary holds people for longer periods of time, such as many years, and is operated by a state or federal government. A jail holds people for shorter periods of time (e.g. for shorter sentences or pre-trial detention) and is usually operated by a local government, typically the county sheriff. Outside of North America, prison and jail often have the same meaning.

History

Ancient and medieval

The use of prisons can be traced back to the rise of the state as a form of social organization.

Some Ancient Greek philosophers, such as Plato, began to develop ideas of using punishment to reform offenders instead of simply using it for its own sake. Imprisonment as a penalty was used initially for those who could not afford to pay their fines. Eventually, since impoverished Athenians could not pay their fines, leading to indefinite periods of imprisonment, time limits were set instead. The prison in ancient Athens was known as the desmoterion ("place of chains").

The Romans were among the first to use prisons as a form of punishment rather than simply for detention. A variety of existing structures were used to house prisoners, such as metal cages, basements of public buildings, and quarries. One of the most notable Roman prisons was the Mamertine Prison, established around 640 B.C. by Ancus Marcius. The Mamertine Prison was located within a sewer system beneath ancient Rome and contained a large network of dungeons where prisoners were held in squalid conditions, contaminated with human waste. Forced labor on public works projects was also a common form of punishment. In many cases, citizens were sentenced to slavery, often in ergastula (a primitive form of prison where unruly slaves were chained to workbenches and performed hard labor).

In Medieval Songhai, results of a trial could have led to confiscation of merchandise or imprisonment as a form of punishment,  since various prisons existed in the empire.

During the Middle Ages in Europe, castles, fortresses, and the basements of public buildings were often used as makeshift prisons. The possession of the right and the capability to imprison citizens, however, granted an air of legitimacy to officials at all levels of government, from kings to regional courts to city councils; and the ability to have someone imprisoned or killed served as a signifier of who in society possessed power or authority over others. Another common punishment was sentencing people to galley slavery, which involved chaining prisoners together in the bottoms of ships and forcing them to row on naval or merchant vessels.

Modern era
The influence of French philosopher Michel Foucault, especially his book Discipline and Punish: The Birth of the Prison (1975), has energized the historical study of prisons and their  role in the overall social system. Discipline and Punish: The Birth of the Prison is an analysis of the social and theoretical mechanisms behind the changes that occurred in Western penal systems during the modern age based on historical documents from France. Foucault argues that prison did not become the principal form of punishment just because of the humanitarian concerns of reformists. He traces the cultural shifts that led to the predominance of prison via the body and power. Prison used by the "disciplines" – new technological powers that can also be found, according to Foucault, in places such as schools, hospitals, and military barracks.

From the late 17th century and during the 18th century, popular resistance to public execution and torture became more widespread both in Europe and in the United States. Particularly under the Bloody Code, with few sentencing alternatives, imposition of the death penalty for petty crimes, such as theft, was proving increasingly unpopular with the public; many jurors were refusing to convict defendants of petty crimes when they knew the defendants would be sentenced to death. Rulers began looking for means to punish and control their subjects in a way that did not cause people to associate them with spectacles of tyrannical and sadistic violence. They developed systems of mass incarceration, often with hard labor, as a solution. The prison reform movement that arose at this time was heavily influenced by two somewhat contradictory philosophies. The first was based in Enlightenment ideas of utilitarianism and rationalism, and suggested that prisons should simply be used as a more effective substitute for public corporal punishments such as whipping, hanging, etc. This theory, referred to as deterrence, claims that the primary purpose of prisons is to be so harsh and terrifying that they deter people from committing crimes out of fear of going to prison. The second theory, which saw prisons as a form of rehabilitation or moral reform, was based on religious ideas that equated crime with sin, and saw prisons as a place to instruct prisoners in Christian morality, obedience and proper behavior. These later reformers believed that prisons could be constructed as humane institutions of moral instruction, and that prisoners' behavior could be "corrected" so that when they were released, they would be model members of society.

The concept of the modern prison was imported to Europe in the early 19th-century.[from where?] Prior forms of punishment were usually physical, including capital punishment, mutilation, flagellation (whipping), branding, and non-physical punishments, such as public shaming rituals (like the stocks). From the Middle Ages up to the 16th and 17th centuries in Europe, imprisonment was rarely used as a punishment in its own right, and prisons were mainly to hold those awaiting trial and convicts awaiting punishment.

However, an important innovation at the time was the Bridewell House of Corrections, located at Bridewell Palace in London, which resulted in the building of other houses of correction. These houses held mostly petty offenders, vagrants, and the disorderly local poor. In these facilities the inmates were given "prison labor" jobs that were anticipated to shape them into hardworking individuals and prepare them for the real world. By the end of the 17th century, houses of correction were absorbed into local prison facilities under the control of the local justice of the peace.

Transportation, prison ships and penal colonies

England used penal transportation of convicted criminals (and others generally young and poor) for a term of indentured servitude within the general population of British America between the 1610s and 1776. The Transportation Act 1717 made this option available for lesser crimes, or offered it by discretion as a longer-term alternative to the death penalty, which could theoretically be imposed for the growing number of offenses in Britain. The substantial expansion of transportation was the first major innovation in eighteenth-century British penal practice. Transportation to America was abruptly suspended by the Criminal Law Act 1776 (16 Geo. 3 c.43) with the start of the American Rebellion. While sentencing to transportation continued, the act instituted a punishment policy of hard labour instead. The suspension of transport also prompted the use of prisons for punishment and the initial start of a prison building program. Britain would resume transportation to specifically planned penal colonies in Australia between 1788 and 1868.

Jails at the time were run as business ventures, and contained both felons and debtors; the latter were often housed with their wives and younger children. The jailers made their money by charging the inmates for food, drink, and other services, and the system was generally corruptible.  One reform of the seventeenth century was the establishment of the London Bridewell as a house of correction for women and children. It was the first facility to make any medical services available to prisoners.

With the widely used alternative of penal transportation halted in the 1770s, the immediate need for additional penal accommodations emerged. Given the undeveloped institutional facilities, old sailing vessels, termed hulks, were the most readily available and expandable choice to be used as places of temporary confinement. While conditions on these ships were generally appalling, their use and the labor thus provided set a precedent which persuaded many people that mass incarceration and labor were viable methods of crime prevention and punishment. The turn of the 19th century would see the first movement toward prison reform, and by the 1810s, the first state prisons and correctional facilities were built, thereby inaugurating the modern prison facilities available today.

France also sent criminals to overseas penal colonies, including Louisiana, in the early 18th century. Penal colonies in French Guiana operated until 1952, such as the notable Devil's Island (Île du Diable). Katorga prisons were harsh work camps established in the 17th century in Russia, in remote underpopulated areas of Siberia and the Russian Far East, that had few towns or food sources. Siberia quickly gained its fearful connotation of punishment.

Prison reform movement

John Howard was one of the most notable early prison reformers. After having visited several hundred prisons across Great Britain and Europe, in his capacity as high sheriff of Bedfordshire, he published The State of the Prisons in 1777. He was particularly appalled to discover prisoners who had been acquitted but were still confined because they could not pay the jailer's fees. He proposed wide-ranging reforms to the system, including the housing of each prisoner in a separate cell and the requirements that staff should be professional and paid by the government, that outside inspection of prisons should be imposed, and that prisoners should be provided with a healthy diet and reasonable living conditions. The prison reform charity, the Howard League for Penal Reform, was established in 1866 by his admirers.

Following Howard's agitation, the Penitentiary Act was passed in 1779. This introduced solitary confinement, religious instruction, a labor regime, and proposed two state penitentiaries (one for men and one for women). However, these were never built due to disagreements in the committee and pressures from wars with France, and jails remained a local responsibility. But other measures passed in the next few years provided magistrates with the powers to implement many of these reforms, and eventually, in 1815, jail fees were abolished.

Quakers were prominent in campaigning against and publicizing the dire state of the prisons at the time. Elizabeth Fry documented the conditions that prevailed at Newgate prison, where the ladies' section was overcrowded with women and children, some of whom had not even received a trial. The inmates did their own cooking and washing in the small cells in which they slept on straw. In 1816, Fry founded a prison school for the children who were imprisoned with their parents. She also began a system of supervision and required the women to sew and to read the Bible. In 1817, she helped to found the Association for the Reformation of the Female Prisoners in Newgate.

Development of the modern prison
The theory of the modern prison system was born in London, influenced by the utilitarianism of Jeremy Bentham. Bentham's panopticon introduced the principle of observation and control that underpins the design of the modern prison. The notion of prisoners being incarcerated as part of their punishment and not simply as a holding state until trial or hanging, was at the time revolutionary. His views influenced the establishment of the first prisons used as criminal rehabilitation centers. At a time when the implementation of capital punishment for a variety of relatively trivial offenses was on the decline, the notion of incarceration as a form of punishment and correction held great appeal to reform-minded thinkers and politicians.

In the first half of the 19th century, capital punishment came to be regarded as inappropriate for many crimes that it had previously been carried out for, and by the mid-19th century, imprisonment had replaced the death penalty for the most serious offenses except for murder.

The first state prison in England was the Millbank Prison, established in 1816 with a capacity for just under 1,000 inmates. By 1824, 54 prisons had adopted the disciplinary system advocated by the SIPD. By the 1840s, penal transportation to Australia and the use of hulks was on the decline, and the Surveyor-General of convict prisons, Joshua Jebb, set an ambitious program of prison building in the country, with one large prison opening per year. Pentonville prison opened in 1842, beginning a trend of ever increasing incarceration rates and the use of prison as the primary form of crime punishment. Robert Peel's Gaols Act of 1823 introduced regular visits to prisoners by chaplains, provided for the payment of jailers and prohibited the use of irons and manacles.

In 1786, the state of Pennsylvania passed a law that mandated that all convicts who had not been sentenced to death would be placed in penal servitude to do public works projects such as building roads, forts, and mines. Besides the economic benefits of providing a free source of hard labor, the proponents of the new penal code also thought that this would deter criminal activity by making a conspicuous public example of consequences of breaking the law. However, what actually ended up happening was frequent spectacles of disorderly conduct by the convict work crews, and the generation of sympathetic feelings from the citizens who witnessed the mistreatment of the convicts. The laws quickly drew criticism from a humanitarian perspective (as cruel, exploitative and degrading) and from a utilitarian perspective (as failing to deter crime and delegitimizing the state in the eyes of the public). Reformers such as Benjamin Rush came up with a solution that would enable the continued use of forced labor while keeping disorderly conduct and abuse out of the eyes of the public. They suggested that prisoners be sent to secluded "houses of repentance" where they would be subjected (out of the view of the public) to "bodily pain, labor, watchfulness, solitude, and silence ... joined with cleanliness and a simple diet".

Pennsylvania soon put this theory into practice, and turned its old jail at Walnut Street in Philadelphia into a state prison, in 1790. This prison was modeled on what became known as the "Pennsylvania system" (or "separate system"), and placed all prisoners into solitary cells with nothing other than religious literature, made them wear prison uniforms, and forced them to be completely silent to reflect on their wrongs. New York soon built the Newgate state prison in Greenwich Village, which was modeled on the Pennsylvania system, and other states followed.

But, by 1820, faith in the efficacy of legal reform had declined, as statutory changes had no discernible effect on the level of crime, and the prisons, where prisoners shared large rooms and booty including alcohol, had become riotous and prone to escapes. In response, New York developed the Auburn system in which prisoners were confined in separate cells and prohibited from talking when eating and working together, implementing it at Auburn State Prison and Sing Sing at Ossining. The aim of this was rehabilitative: the reformers talked about the penitentiary serving as a model for the family and the school and almost all the states adopted the plan (though Pennsylvania went even further in separating prisoners). The system's fame spread and visitors to the U.S. to see the prisons included de Tocqueville who wrote Democracy in America as a result of his visit.

The use of prisons in Continental Europe was never as popular as it became in the English-speaking world, although state prison systems were largely in place by the end of the 19th century in most European countries. After the unification of Italy in 1861, the government reformed the repressive and arbitrary prison system they inherited, and modernized and secularized criminal punishment by emphasizing discipline and deterrence. Italy developed an advanced penology under the leadership of Cesare Lombroso (1835–1909).

Another prominent prison reformer who made important contributions was Alexander Paterson who advocated for the necessity of humanizing and socializing methods within the prison system in Great Britain and America.

Staff
Prisons employ people to run and maintain the prison while keeping control of the inmates. Oftentimes, the number of people employed within a prison depends upon factors such as the size of the prison, how many inmates the prison has, and how much funding the prison gets.

Warden
The Warden is the official who is in charge of the prison and heads all the staff.

Prison guards
Security staff, also known as prison guards, are enforcement officials who are in charge of enforcing prison rules among the inmates. Thus they are responsible for the care, custody and control of the prison.

Teachers
Teachers are employed to provide education for inmates to use after their release, in order to reduce the likelihood of the inmates reoffending.

Case managers
Case managers are people who perform correctional casework in an institutional setting; develop, evaluate, and analyze program needs and other data about inmates; evaluate progress of individual offenders in the institution; coordinate and integrate inmate training programs; develop social histories; evaluate positive and negative aspects in each case situation, and develop release.

Counselors
Prison counselors are people who are employed to intervene therapeutically with various clients, the majority of whom happen to be offenders. These interventions include prison adjustment, prerelease and postrelease vocational and marital/family readjustment, and work with adolescent adjustment problems.

Medical workers
The medical workers are doctors and nurses who are tasked with providing the inmates with healthcare.

Work release supervisors
A work release supervisor is someone who is tasked with monitoring inmates outside of the prison during a work release program.

Contractors
In private prisons, contractors are people who paid the prison for the use of prison labor and supplied the prisoners with work.

Religious workers
Prisons also provide religious workers to meet the religious need for inmates. Religious workers are also in charge of the weddings when inmates marry someone outside the prison.

Work done by inmates
In addition to the prison staff, inmates are often tasked with doing work around the jail such as cooking food for the other inmates or providing cleaning services around the prison.

Design

Security

Prisons are normally surrounded by fencing, walls, earthworks, geographical features, or other barriers to prevent escape. Multiple barriers, concertina wire, electrified fencing, secured and defensible main gates, armed guard towers, security lighting, motion sensors, dogs and roving patrols may all also be present depending on the level of security.

Remotely controlled doors, CCTV monitoring, alarms, cages, restraints, nonlethal and lethal weapons, riot-control gear and physical segregation of units and prisoners may all also be present within a prison to monitor and control the movement and activity of prisoners within the facility.

Modern prison designs have increasingly sought to restrict and control the movement of prisoners throughout the facility and also to allow a smaller prison staff to monitor prisoners directly, often using a decentralized "podular" layout. (In comparison, 19th-century prisons had large landings and cell blocks which permitted only intermittent observation of prisoners.) Smaller, separate and self-contained housing units known as "pods" or "modules" are designed to hold 16 to 50 prisoners and are arranged around exercise yards or support facilities in a decentralized "campus" pattern. A small number of prison officers, sometimes a single officer, supervise each pod. The pods contain tiers of cells arranged around a central control station or desk from which a single officer can monitor all the cells and the entire pod, control cell doors and communicate with the rest of the prison.

Pods may be designed for high-security "indirect supervision", in which officers in segregated and sealed control booths monitor smaller numbers of prisoners confined to their cells. An alternative is "direct supervision", in which officers work within the pod and directly interact with and supervise prisoners, who may spend the day outside their cells in a central "dayroom" on the floor of the pod. Movement in or out of the pod to and from exercise yards, work assignments or medical appointments can be restricted to individual pods at designated times and is generally centrally controlled. Goods and services, such as meals, laundry, commissary, educational materials, religious services and medical care can increasingly be brought to individual pods or cells as well. Some modern prisons may exclude certain inmates from the general population, usually for safety reasons, such as those within solitary confinement, celebrities, political figures and former law enforcement officers, those convicted of sexual crimes and/or crimes against children, or those on the medical wing or protective custody.

Inmate security classifications

Generally, when an inmate arrives at a prison, they go through a security classification screening and risk assessment that determines where they will be placed within the prison system. Classifications are assigned by assessing the prisoner's personal history and criminal record, and through subjective determinations made by intake personnel (which include mental health workers, counselors, clerical staff, sheriff deputies, prison unit managers, and others). This process will have a major impact on the prisoner's experience, determining their security level, educational and work programs, mental health status (e.g. the determination of whether they will be placed in a mental health unit), and many other factors. This sorting of prisoners is one of the fundamental techniques through which the prison administration maintains control over the inmate population and attempts to reduce risks and liabilities in an attempt to create an orderly and secure prison environment. At some prisons, prisoners are made to wear a prison uniform.

The levels of security within a prison system are categorized differently around the world, but tend to follow a distinct pattern. At one end of the spectrum are the most secure facilities ("maximum security"), which typically hold prisoners that are considered dangerous, disruptive or likely to try to escape. Furthermore, in recent times, supermax prisons have been created where the custody level goes beyond maximum security for people such as terrorists or political prisoners deemed a threat to national security, and inmates from other prisons who have a history of violent or other disruptive behavior in prison or are suspected of gang affiliation. These inmates have individual cells and are kept in lockdown, often for more than 23 hours per day. Meals are served through "chuck-holes" in the cell door, and each inmate is allowed one hour of outdoor exercise per day, alone. They are normally permitted no contact with other inmates and are under constant surveillance via closed-circuit television cameras.

On the other end are "minimum security" prisons which are most often used to house those for whom more stringent security is deemed unnecessary. For example, prisoners convicted of white-collar crime (which rarely results in incarceration) are almost always sent to minimum-security prisons due to them having committed nonviolent crimes. Lower-security prisons are often designed with less restrictive features, confining prisoners at night in smaller locked dormitories or even cottage or cabin-like housing while permitting them free movement around the grounds to work or partake in activities during the day. Some countries (such as Great Britain) also have "open" prisons where prisoners are allowed home-leave or part-time employment outside of the prison. Suomenlinna Island facility in Finland is an example of one such "open" correctional facility. The prison has been open since 1971 and, as of September 2013, the facility's 95 male prisoners leave the prison grounds on a daily basis to work in the corresponding township or commute to the mainland for either work or study. Prisoners can rent flat-screen televisions, sound systems, and mini-refrigerators with the prison-labor wages that they can earn—wages range between 4.10 and €7.30 per hour. With electronic monitoring, prisoners are also allowed to visit their families in Helsinki and eat together with the prison staff. Prisoners in Scandinavian facilities are permitted to wear their own clothes.

There are fundamental differences between the security level of men's prisons and that of women's prisons. Male prisons tend to have higher, or more severe, security levels/classifications than female prisons. This is even noticeable when comparing the construction and design of male prisons which tend to have very tall walls and towers, barbed wire and other serious security measures whereas these types of high level security measures are absent at many female prisons. This is due to multiple factors including females being convicted of less severe offences, and being less likely to be convicted of violent offences, in comparison to males, and due to female prisoners being less likely to be violent than male prisoners.

Common facilities

Modern prisons often hold hundreds or thousands of inmates, and must have facilities onsite to meet most of their needs, including dietary, health, fitness, education, religious practices, entertainment, and many others. Conditions in prisons vary widely around the world, and the types of facilities within prisons depend on many intersecting factors including funding, legal requirements, and cultural beliefs/practices. Nevertheless, in addition to the cell blocks that contain the prisoners,  there are also certain auxiliary facilities that are common in prisons throughout the world.

Kitchen and dining

Prisons generally have to provide food for a large number of individuals, and thus are generally equipped with a large institutional kitchen. There are many security considerations, however, that are unique to the prison dining environment. For instance, cutlery equipment must be very carefully monitored and accounted for at all times, and the layout of prison kitchens must be designed in a way that allows staff to observe activity of the kitchen staff (who are usually prisoners). The quality of kitchen equipment varies from prison to prison, depending on when the prison was constructed, and the level of funding available to procure new equipment. Prisoners are often served food in a large cafeteria with rows of tables and benches that are securely attached to the floor. However, inmates that are locked in control units, or prisons that are on "lockdown" (where prisoners are made to remain in their cells all day) have trays of food brought to their cells and served through "chuck-holes" in the cell door. Prison food in many developed countries is nutritionally adequate for most inmates.

Healthcare

Prisons in wealthy, industrialized nations provide medical care for most of their inmates. Additionally, prison medical staff play a major role in monitoring, organizing, and controlling the prison population through the use of psychiatric evaluations and interventions (psychiatric drugs, isolation in mental health units, etc.). Prison populations are largely from poor minority communities that experience greater rates of chronic illness, substance abuse, and mental illness than the general population. This leads to a high demand for medical services, and in countries such as the US that don't provide tax-payer funded healthcare, prison is often the first place that people are able to receive medical treatment (which they couldn't afford outside).

Some prison medical facilities include primary care, mental health services, dental care, substance abuse treatment, and other forms of specialized care, depending on the needs of the inmate population and the willingness of the prison to provide for these needs. Health care services in many prisons have long been criticized as inadequate, underfunded, and understaffed, and many prisoners have experienced abuse and mistreatment at the hands of prison medical staff who are entrusted with their care.

In the United States, a million incarcerated people suffer from mental illness without any assistance or treatment for their condition. The tendency of a convicted criminal to reoffend, known as the rate of recidivism, is unusually high for those with the most serious disorders. Analysis of data in 2000 from several forensic hospitals in California, New York and Oregon found that with treatment the rate of recidivism was "much lower" than untreated mentally ill offenders.

Library and educational facilities

Some prisons provide educational programs for inmates that can include basic literacy, secondary education, or even college education. Prisoners seek education for a variety of reasons, including the development of skills for after release, personal enrichment and curiosity, finding something to fill their time, or trying to please prison staff (which can often secure early release for good behavior). However, the educational needs of prisoners often come into conflict with the security concerns of prison staff and with a public that wants to be "tough on crime" (and thus supports denying prisoners access to education). Whatever their reasons for participating in educational programs, prison populations tend to have very low literacy rates and lack of basic mathematical skills, and many have not completed secondary education. This lack of basic education severely limits their employment opportunities outside of prison, leading to high rates of recidivism, and research has shown that prison education can play a significant role in helping prisoners reorient their lives and become successful after reentry.

Many prisons also provide a library where prisoners can check out books, or do legal research for their cases. Often these libraries are very small, consisting of a few shelves of books. In some countries, such as the United States, drastic budget cuts have resulted in many prison libraries being shut down. Meanwhile, many nations that have historically lacked prison libraries are starting to develop them. Prison libraries can dramatically improve the quality of life for prisoners, who have large amounts of empty time on their hands that can be occupied with reading. This time spent reading has a variety of benefits including improved literacy, ability to understand rules and regulations (leading to improved behavior), ability to read books that encourage self-reflection and analysis of one's emotional state, consciousness of important real-world events, and education that can lead to successful re-entry into society after release.

Recreation and fitness
Many prisons provide limited recreational and fitness facilities for prisoners. The provision of these services is controversial, with certain elements of society claiming that prisons are being "soft" on inmates, and others claiming that it is cruel and dehumanizing to confine people for years without any recreational opportunities. The tension between these two opinions, coupled with lack of funding, leads to a large variety of different recreational procedures at different prisons. Prison administrators, however, generally find the provision of recreational opportunities to be useful at maintaining order in the prisons, because it keeps prisoners occupied and provides leverage to gain compliance (by depriving prisoners of recreation as punishment). Examples of common facilities/programs that are available in some prisons are: gyms and weightlifting rooms, arts and crafts, games (such as cards, chess, or bingo), television sets, and sports teams. Additionally, many prisons have an outdoor recreation area, commonly referred to as an "exercise yard".

Control units

Most prisoners are part of the "general population" of the prison, members of which are generally able to socialize with each other in common areas of the prison. Other prisoners that are often segregated from the general population include those who are in protective custody, or who are on suicide watch, and those whose behavior presents a threat to other prisoners.

Other facilities

In addition to the above facilities, others that are common include prison factories and workshops, visiting areas, mail rooms, telephone and computer rooms, a prison store (often called a "canteen") where prisoners can purchase goods with prison commissary. Some prisons have a death row where prisoners who have been sentenced to death await execution and an execution room, where the death sentence is carried out. In places like Singapore and Malaysia, there is place for corporal punishment (carried out by caning).

Special types

Youth detention facilities

Prisons for juveniles are known by a variety of names, including "youth detention facilities", "juvenile detention centers", and "reformatories". The purpose of youth detention facilities is to keep young offenders away from the public, while working towards rehabilitation. The idea of separately treating youthful and adult offenders is a relatively modern idea. The earliest known use of the term "juvenile delinquency" was in London in 1816, from where it quickly spread to the United States. The first juvenile correctional institution in the United States opened in 1825 in New York City. By 1917, juvenile courts had been established in all but 3 states. It was estimated that in 2011 more than 95,000 juveniles were locked up in prisons and jails in the United States (the largest youth prisoner population in the world). Besides prisons, many other types of residential placement exist within juvenile justice systems, including youth homes, community-based programs, training schools and boot camps.

Like adult facilities, youth detention centers in some countries are experiencing overcrowding due to large increases in incarceration rates of young offenders. Crowding can create extremely dangerous environments in juvenile detention centers and juvenile correctional facilities. Overcrowding may also lead to the decrease in availability to provide the youth with much needed and promised programs and services while they are in the facility. Many times the administration is not prepared to handle the large number of residents and therefore the facilities can become unstable and create instability in simple logistics.

In addition to overcrowding, juvenile prisons are questioned for their overall effectiveness in rehabilitating youth. Many critics note high juvenile recidivism rates, and the fact that the most of the youths that are incarcerated are those from lower socio-economic classes (who often suffer from broken families, lack of educational/job opportunities, and violence in their communities).

Women's prisons

In the 19th century, a growing awareness that female prisoners had different needs to male prisoners led to the establishment of dedicated prisons for women. In modern times, it is the norm for female inmates to be housed in either a separate prison or a separate wing of a unisex prison. The aim is to protect them from physical and sexual abuse that would otherwise occur.

In the Western world, the guards of women's prisons are usually female, though not always. For example, in federal women's correction facilities of the United States, 70% of guards are male. Rape and sexual offenses remain commonplace in many women's prisons, and are usually underreported. Two studies in the late 2000s noted that because a high proportion of female inmates have experienced sexual abuse in the past, they are particularly vulnerable to further abuse.

The needs of mothers during pregnancy and childbirth often conflict with the demands of the prison system. The Rebecca Project, a non-profit organization that campaigns for women's rights issues, reports that "In 2007, the Bureau of Justice Statistics stated that, on average, 5% of women who enter into state prisons are pregnant and in jails [local prisons] 6% of women are pregnant". The standard of care that female prisoners receive before and after giving birth is often far worse than the standard expected by the general population, and sometimes almost none is given. In some countries, female prisoners may be restrained while giving birth. In many countries including the United States, mothers will frequently be separated from their baby after giving birth.

Research has shown a significant link between females in prison and brain injury  which supports research that shows incarcerated females are overwhelmingly victims of domestic violence (mainly male violence against women).

Military prisons and prisoner-of-war camps

Prisons have formed parts of military systems since the French Revolution. France set up its system in 1796. They were modernized in 1852 and since their existence, are used variously to house prisoners of war, unlawful combatants, those whose freedom is deemed a national security risk by military or civilian authorities, and members of the military found guilty of a serious crime. Military prisons in the United States have also been converted to civilian prisons, to include Alcatraz Island. Alcatraz was formerly a military prison for soldiers during the American Civil War.

In the American Revolution, British prisoners held by the U.S. were assigned to local farmers as laborers. The British kept American sailors in broken down ship hulks with high death rates.

In the Napoleonic wars, the broken down hulks were still in use for naval prisoners. One French surgeon recalled his captivity in Spain, where scurvy, diarrhea, dysentery, and typhus abounded, and prisoners died by the thousands:
"These great trunks of ships were immense coffins, in which living men were consigned to a slow death.... [In the hot weather we had] black army bread full of gritty particles, biscuit full of maggots, salt meat that was already decomposing, rancid lard, spoiled cod, [and] stale rice, peas, and beans."

In the American Civil War, at first prisoners of war were released, after they promised not to fight again unless formally exchanged. When the Confederacy refused to exchange black prisoners the system broke down, and each side built large-scale POW camps. Conditions in terms of housing, food, and medical care were bad in the Confederacy, and the Union retaliated by imposing harsh conditions.

By 1900 the legal framework of the Geneva and Hague Convention provided considerable protection. In the First World War, millions of prisoners were held on both sides, with no major atrocities. Officers received privileged treatment. There was an increase in the use of forced labor throughout Europe. Food and medical treatment were generally comparable to what active duty soldiers received, and housing was much better than front-line conditions.

Political prisons and administrative detention

Political prisoners are people who have been imprisoned because of their political beliefs, activities and affiliations. There is much debate about who qualifies as a "political prisoner". The category of "political prisoner" is often contested, and many regimes that incarcerate political prisoners often claim that they are merely "criminals". Others who are sometimes classified as "political prisoners" include prisoners who were politicized in prison, and are subsequently punished for their involvement with political causes.

Many countries maintain or have in the past had a system of prisons specifically intended for political prisoners. In some countries, dissidents can be detained, tortured, executed, and/or "disappeared" without trial. This can happen either legally, or extralegally (sometimes by falsely accusing people and fabricating evidence against them).

Administrative detention is a classification of prisons or detention centers where people are held without trial.

Psychiatric facilities

Some psychiatric facilities have characteristics of prisons, particularly when confining patients who have committed a crime and are considered dangerous. In addition, many prisons have psychiatric units dedicated to housing offenders diagnosed with a wide variety of mental disorders. The United States government refers to psychiatric prisons as "Federal Medical Centers (FMC)".

Prison population 

Some jurisdictions refer to the prison population (total or per-prison) as the prison muster.

In 2021, the World Prison Brief reported that at least 11.5 million people were imprisoned worldwide.

In 2021 the United States of America had the world's largest prison population, with over 2 million people in American prisons or jails—up from 744,000 in 1985—making 1 in every 200 American adults a prisoner. In 2017, the nonprofit organization Prison Policy Initiative estimated that the United States government spent an estimated US$80.7 billion to maintain prisons. CNBC estimated that the cost of maintaining the US prison system was US$74 billion per year.  This increases government spending on prisons.  the US no longer has the highest incarceration rate in the world, with El Salvador now having the highest.

Not all countries have experienced a rise in prison population: Sweden closed four prisons in 2013 due to a significant drop in the number of inmates. The head of Sweden's prison and probation services characterized the decrease in the number of Swedish prisoners as "out-of-the-ordinary", with prison numbers in Sweden falling by around 1% a year since 2004.

The United Nations Office on Drugs and Crime website hosts data regarding prison populations around the world, including "Persons held - by sex, by age group," "Persons held - by status and sex" and "Prison capacity and overcrowding - totals".

Economics of the prison industry

In the United States alone, more than $74 billion per year is spent on prisons, with over 800,000 people employed in the prison industry. As the prison population grows, revenues increase for a variety of small and large businesses that construct facilities, and provide equipment (security systems, furniture, clothing), and services (transportation, communications, healthcare, food) for prisons. These parties have a strong interest in the expansion of the prison system since their development and prosperity directly depends on the number of inmates.

The prison industry also includes private businesses that benefit from the exploitation of the prison labor. Some scholars, using the term prison-industrial complex, have argued that the trend of "hiring out prisoners" is a continuation of the slavery tradition, pointing out that the Thirteenth Amendment to the United States Constitution freed slaves but allowed forced labor for people convicted of crimes. Prisons are very attractive to employers, because prisoners can be made to perform a great array of jobs, under conditions that most free laborers wouldn't accept (and would be illegal outside of prisons): sub-minimum wage payments, no insurance, no collective bargaining, lack of alternative options, etc. Prison labor can soon deprive the free labor of jobs in a number of sectors, since the organized labor turns out to be uncompetitive compared to the prison counterpart.

Social effects

Internal

Prisons can be difficult places to live and work in, even in developed countries in the present day. By their very definition, prisons house individuals who may be prone to violence and rule-breaking. It is also typical that a high proportion of inmates have mental health concerns. A 2014 US report found that this included 64% of local jail inmates, 54% of state prisoners and 45% of federal prisoners. The environment may be worsened by overcrowding, poor sanitation and maintenance, violence by prisoners against other prisoners or staff, staff misconduct, prison gangs, self-harm, and the widespread smuggling of illegal drugs and other contraband. The social system within the prison commonly develops an "inmate code", an informal set of internal values and rules that govern prison life and relationships, but that may be at odds with the interests of prison management or external society, compromising future rehabilitation. In some cases, disorder can escalate into a full-scale prison riot. Academic research has found that poor conditions tend to increase the likelihood of violence within prisons.

External
Prisoners can face difficulty re-integrating back into society upon their release. They often have difficulty finding work, earn less money when they do find work, and experience a wide range of medical and psychological issues. Many countries have a high recidivism rate. According to the Bureau of Justice Statistics, 67.8% of released prisoners in the United States are rearrested within three years and 76.6% are rearrested within five years. If the prisoner has a family, they are likely to suffer socially and economically from their absence.

If a society has a very high imprisonment rate, these effects become noticeable not just on family units, but also on entire poor communities or communities of color. The expensive cost of maintaining a high imprisonment rate also costs money that must come at the expense of either the taxpayer or other government agencies.

Theories of punishment and criminality
A variety of justifications and explanations are put forth for why people are imprisoned by the state. The most common of these are:

 Rehabilitation: Theories of rehabilitation argue that the purpose of imprisonment is to change prisoners' lives in a way that will make them productive and law-abiding members of society once they are released. The idea was promoted by 19th century reformers, who promoted prisons as a humane alternative to harsh punishments of the past. Many governments and prison systems have adopted rehabilitation as an official aim. In the United States and Canada, prison agencies are often referred to as "Corrections" services for this reason.
 Deterrence: Theories of deterrence argue that by sentencing criminals to extremely harsh penalties, other people who might be considering criminal activities will be so terrified of the consequences that they will choose not to commit crimes out of fear.
 Incapacitation: Theories of  argue that while prisoners are incarcerated, they will be unable to commit crimes, thus keeping communities safer.
 Retribution: Theories of  argue that the purpose of imprisonment is to cause a sufficient level of misery to the prisoner, in proportion to the perceived seriousness of their crime. These theories do not necessarily focus on whether or not a particular punishment benefits the community, but instead are based upon a belief that some kind of moral balance will be achieved by "paying back" the prisoner for the wrongs they have committed.

Evaluation
Academic studies have been inconclusive as to whether high imprisonment rates reduce crime rates in comparison to low imprisonment rates; only a minority suggest it creates a significant reduction, and others suggest it increases crime.

Prisoners are at risk of being drawn further into crime, as they may become acquainted with other criminals, trained in further criminal activity, exposed to further abuse (both from staff and other prisoners) and left with criminal records that make it difficult to find legal employment after release. All of these things can result in a higher likelihood of reoffending upon release.

This has resulted in a series of studies that are skeptical towards the idea that prison can rehabilitate offenders. As Morris and Rothman (1995) point out, "It's hard to train for freedom in a cage." A few countries have been able to operate prison systems with a low recidivism rate, including Norway and Sweden. On the other hand, in many countries including the United States, the vast majority of prisoners are rearrested within 3 years of their release. Prison reform organizations such as the Howard League for Penal Reform are not entirely opposed to attempting to rehabilitate offenders, but instead argue that most prisoners would be more likely to be rehabilitated if they received a punishment other than prison.

The National Institute of Justice argues that offenders can be deterred by the fear of being caught but are unlikely to be deterred by the fear or experience of the punishment. Like Lawrence W. Sherman, they argue that better policing is a more effective way to reduce crime rates.

The argument that prisons can reduce crime through incapacitation is more widely accepted, even among academics who doubt that prisons can rehabilitate or deter offenders. A dissenting argument from Arrigo and Milovanovic, who argue that prisoners will simply continue to victimize people inside of the prison and that this harm has impacts on the society outside.

Alternatives

Modern prison reform movements generally seek to reduce prison populations. A key goal is to improve conditions by reducing overcrowding. Prison reformers also argue that alternative methods are often better at rehabilitating offenders and preventing crime in the long term. Among the countries that have sought to actively reduce prison populations include Sweden, Germany and the Netherlands.

Alternatives to prison sentences include:
Fines
Community service
Suspended sentence: The offender performs of a period of probation, and only serves a prison sentence if the terms of probation are broken. This is similar to the Canadian concept of a conditional sentence.
House arrest/curfews: Sometimes a condition of a strict suspended/conditional sentence.
Mandatory treatment for drug offenders.
Rehabilitation programs, such as anger management classes.
Mental health treatment for offenders with mental illness.
Conditional discharge: The offender is not punished for the crime if they abide by certain conditions; typically they must not commit any further crimes within a designated period.
Other court orders that take away privileges from the offender, such as banning motoring offenders from driving.
Restorative justice programs, which overlap with the above methods. Restorative justice is based around arranging a mediation between the offender and victim, so that the offenders can take responsibility for their actions, "to repair the harm they've done—by apologizing, returning stolen money, or community service".
When these alternatives are used, actual imprisonment may be used as a punishment for noncompliance.

The prison abolition movement seeks to eliminate prisons altogether. It is distinct from prison reform, although abolitionists often support reform campaigns, regarding them as incremental steps towards abolishing prisons. The abolition movement is motivated by a belief that prisons are inherently ineffective  and discriminatory. The movement is associated with libertarian socialism, anarchism and anti-authoritarianism, with some prison abolitionists arguing that imprisoning people for actions the state designates as crimes is not only inexpedient but also immoral.

See also

Notes

References

Further reading

 
 Diiulio, John J., Governing Prisons: A Comparative Study of Correctional Management, Simon & Schuster, 1990. .
 
 
 
 Fisher, George. "The birth of the prison retold." Yale Law Journal 104.6 (1995): 1235–1324. online free
 
 
 
 
 
 Moran, Dominique (2015) Carceral Geography: Spaces and Practices of Incarceration Routledge ISBN 9781138308466
 
 
 
 
 
 
 Skarbek, David. 2020. The Puzzle of Prison Order: Why Life Behind Bars Varies Around the World. Oxford University Press.
 
 
 SpearIt, Economic Interest Convergence in Downsizing Imprisonment (2014). University of Pittsburgh Law Review, Vol. 25, 2014. Available at SSRN: http://ssrn.com/abstract=2608698 
 SpearIt, Shackles Beyond the Sentence: How Legal Financial Obligations Create a Permanent Underclass (July 9, 2015). 1 Impact 46 (2015). Available at SSRN: http://ssrn.com/abstract=2628977

External links

 Federal Bureau of Prisons
 Priston Radio Official website
 

 
Penology
Total institutions